Crocus bertiscensis is a species of flowering plant growing from a corm, native to the northern Albanian Alps.

References

bertiscensis